Nissar Ahmed  is an Indian Educationalist, entrepreneur, CO Founder Chairman of Presidency Group of Institutions (The BPGI Group) and Founder Chancellor of Presidency University, Bangalore.

References

Living people
Businesspeople from Karnataka
20th-century Indian educational theorists
Indian chairpersons of corporations
Year of birth missing (living people)